The 2009 Diamond Head Classic was a mid-season eight-team college basketball tournament played on December 22 , 23, and 25 at the Stan Sheriff Center in Honolulu, Hawaii. It was the first annual Diamond Head Classic tournament and was part of the 2009–10 NCAA Division I men's basketball season. USC defeated No. 20-ranked UNLV to win the tournament championship. Mike Gerrity was named the tournament's MVP.

Bracket

All-tournament team

Source

References

Diamond Head Classic
Diamond Head Classic
Diamond Head Classic